Tobis may refer to:

Tobis Film, German studio. 
Tobis Portuguesa, a company formed to foster the development of Portuguese cinema.
Yvonne Tobis (born 1948), Israeli Olympic swimmer.